The United States census of 1860 was the eighth census conducted in the United States starting June 1, 1860, and lasting five months. It determined the population of the United States to be 31,443,322 in 33 states and 10 organized territories. This was an increase of 35.4 percent over the 23,069,876 persons enumerated during the 1850 census. The total population included 3,953,762 slaves.

By the time the 1860 census returns were ready for tabulation, the nation was sinking into the American Civil War. As a result, Census Superintendent Joseph C. G. Kennedy and his staff produced only an abbreviated set of public reports, without graphic or cartographic representations. The statistics did allow the census staff to produce a cartographic display, including preparing maps of Southern states, for Union field commanders.  These maps displayed militarily vital topics, including the white population, slave population, predominant agricultural products (by county), and rail and post road transportation routes.

This census saw Philadelphia regain its position as a second-most populous American city, which it had lost to Baltimore in 1820, due to the Act of Consolidation, 1854 merging many smaller surrounding townships, such as Spring Garden, Northern Liberties, and Kensington, into the main city of Philadelphia. Philadelphia would lose the second-most populous American city position to Chicago in 1890.

Census questions

The 1860 census Schedule 1 (Free Inhabitants) was one of two schedules that counted the population of the United States; the other was Schedule 2 (Slave Inhabitants).
Schedule 1 collected the following information:

Schedule 2 (Slave Inhabitants) collected the following information:

Data availability
Full documentation for the 1860 population census, including microdata, census forms and enumerator instructions, is available from  the Integrated Public Use Microdata Series (IPUMS).  Aggregate data for small areas, together with compatible cartographic boundary files, can be downloaded from the National Historical Geographic Information System.

Common occupations
National data reveals that farmers (owners and tenants) made up nearly 10% of utilized occupations. Farm laborers (wage workers) represent the next highest percent with 3.2%, followed by general laborers at 3.0%.

More localized data shows that other occupations were common. In the town of Essex, Massachusetts, a large section of the women in the labor force were devoted to shoe-binding, while for men the common occupations were farming and shoe-making. This heavy demand of shoe-related labor reinforces the high demand for rigorous physical laborers in the economy, as supported by the data of very large amounts of farm related work as compared to most other labor options.

IPUMS' data also notes that the share of the population that had been enrolled in school or marked as "Student" stood at 0.2%.  This demonstrates a small rate of growth, if any, in the proficiency of the human capital of the time—the skill set a worker has to apply to the labor force, which can increase total output through increased efficiency.

The census of 1860 was the last in which much of Southern wealth was held as slaves—still legally considered property. Analogous to today where wealth can fluctuate with value changes in stocks, factories, and other forms of property, the South suffered a huge loss of total wealth and assets when the American Civil War ended and slaves were no longer counted as physical property.

Population of U.S. states and territories

City rankings

See also
 American Civil War
 Cotton Gin
 Human Capital
 Joseph C. G. Kennedy

Notes

External links

 1860 Census of Population and Housing
 Population of the United States in 1860; compiled from the original returns of the eighth census under the direction of the Secretary of the Interior by Joseph C.G. Kennedy
 U.S. Federal Cens us Mortality Schedules 1850–1880
 Adam Goodheart: "The Census of Doom", NY Times

Census
United States census
United States